An Introduction to Ellie Goulding is the debut extended play (EP) by English singer Ellie Goulding, released on 20 December 2009 by Polydor Records. The EP was released shortly after Goulding was nominated for the BBC Sound of 2010, which she ultimately won.

Track listing

Release history

References

2009 debut EPs
Cherrytree Records albums
Ellie Goulding albums
Indie pop EPs
Interscope Records EPs
Polydor Records EPs
Synth-pop EPs